The Inter-Society Color Council (ISCC) is a non-profit learned society which was created in 1931 to advance the understanding and application of visual color as it relates to science, industry, and art. The Council also serves to coordinate between different organizations in the United States for which color plays a major role (for example, design, printing, or computer graphics). The Council is composed of individual members and Sustaining Members, and supplies the United States' representatives to the International Commission on Illumination. The society maintains three Interest Groups to provide focus for presentations at conferences. The Interest Groups are Fundamental and Applied Color Research, Industrial Applications of Color, and Art, Design, and Psychology.

Journal 

The Council endorses the international journal Color Research and Application and encourages the submission of such reports and articles to this journal for consideration for publication. Reprints of such publications and of others that may be of interest to Council members may from time to time be made available to all members.

Conferences 

The society hosts its Annual Meeting as well as Special Topics Meetings.  In addition, it participates in meetings of other societies.  The Annual Meeting includes meetings of the Project Committees and sessions of three Interest Groups:
 Fundamental & Applied Color Research;
 Industrial Application of Color; and
 Art, Design & Psychology.
Special Topics meetings include presentations on one or more areas specific to the meeting.  The Council is also active in promoting color education, including development of programs and resources for schools, along with the Colour Literacy Project.

Awards 

The society presents three awards, the Godlove Award, the Macbeth Award, and the Nickerson Award.

Past Leaders of the Council

Chairs 
 1931  E. N. Gathercoal
 1933  A. E. O. Munsell
 1934-1935 M. H. Rorke (** Acting Chair)
 1936  M. R. Paul
 1938  F. L. Dimmick
 1940  D. B. Judd
 1942  D. B. Judd
 1944  M. J. Zigler
 1946  R. M. Evans
 1948  I. H. Godlove
 1950  I. A. Balinkin
 1952  E. I. Stearns

Presidents 

 1954  D. Nickerson 
 1956  Waldron Faulkner
 1958  W. C. Granville
 1960  G. L. Erikson
 1962  W. J. Kiernan
 1964  R. E. Pike
 1966  W. L. Rhodes
 1968  F. W. Billmeyer, Jr. 
 1970  R. M. Hanes
 1972  R. S. Hunter
 1974  R. E. Derby
 1976  C. W. Jerome
 1978  F. Grum
 1980  W. D. Shaeffer
 1982  L. A. Graham
 1984  J. S. Davenport
 1986  A. B. J. Rodrigues
 1988  J. T. Luke
 1990  H. S. Fairman
 1992  P. J. Alessi
 1994  R. L. Connelly
 1996  E. C. Carter
 1998  M. H. Brill
 2000  J. Ladson
 2002  D. C. Rich
 2004  J. Zwinkels
 2006  R. Buckley
 2008  M. Nadal
 2010  F. O'Donnell
 2012  S. Fernandez
 2014  J. Conant
 2016  J. Dimas
 2018  R. Shamey
 2020 D. Wyble
 2022 M. Maggio

See also 

 International Color Consortium
 International Colour Association
 International Organization for Standardization
 American Association of Textile Chemists and Colorists
 ASTM International
 American Society for Photogrammetry and Remote Sensing
 Color Association of the United States

References

External links 

 
 Inter-Society Color Council records 

Learned societies of the United States